Ionel Constantin (born 6 May 1963) is a Romanian sprint canoeist who competed in the mid-1980s. He won two medals at the ICF Canoe Sprint World Championships with a gold (K-4 1000 m: 1983) and a silver (K-4 10000 m: 1986).

Constantin also finished fourth in the K-4 1000 m event at the 1984 Summer Olympics in Los Angeles.

References

1963 births
Canoeists at the 1984 Summer Olympics
Living people
Olympic canoeists of Romania
Romanian male canoeists
ICF Canoe Sprint World Championships medalists in kayak